Jawhar Sircar (born 22 March 1952) is a retired Indian Administrative Services officer, who is prominent as a public intellectual, speaker and writer. He has been elected as a Member of Parliament, Rajya Sabha, the upper house of Parliament on 2 August 2021 on an AITC ticket to represent State of West Bengal. He served as chief executive officer in Prasar Bharati from 2012 to 2016 and has been a prominent officer of the Indian Administrative Service officer from 1975. He was Secretary to Government of India (2008–12) and has also held important portfolios in the Central and State governments.

Summary 

Jawhar Sircar is a Member of the Upper House (Rajya Sabha) of the Indian Parliament who was nominated by the All India Trinamool Congress party and elected uncontested on 2 August 2021 to represent the State of West Bengal. He is a public intellectual based out of Kolkata, who utilises his experience of over 41 years in public administration to stand up for citizens' rights and for multiculturalism.

He has headed India's Culture Ministry from November 2008 to February 2012 – the longest for any Secretary. Sircar supports campaigns to preserve India's inclusive cultural heritage against constant attempts to utilise it for sectarian gains. He has represented India in top international organisations, including the UNESCO and he speaks regularly and writes on public issues relating to the conservation of heritage.

He was CEO of India's public broadcaster, (2012 - 2016) he resigned from the prasar bharati CEO post before his term ended, as he was not comfortable with the NDA government as he was appointed to the post by the UPA government. He has stood up to resist constant encroachments on media freedom and recently, DIGIPUB News India Foundation, that represents all important digital media organisations in India, selected him for its 'appellate committee' – as an individuals with "unimpeachable public service record and accomplishments". He was on its four-member statutory national-level self regulatory mechanism, which is chaired by the former Supreme Court judge Justice Madan Lokur.

Jawhar Sircar was an active member of a powerful pressure group of retired central secretaries, chief secretaries of states, director generals of police, Indian ambassadors and others, known as the 'Constitutional Conduct Group'. It is on the forefront of protests against encroachments on the constitutionally mandated democratic framework of India. Even otherwise, Sircar is involved with civil society in its constant opposition to right-wing political and governmental forces encroaching on liberty of thought, idea, expression and belief.

He studied at the universities of Calcutta, Presidency, Cambridge and Sussex and has two master's degrees in History and Sociology. His main field work has been on social history, popular religion and the cult of Dharma Thakur in western Bengal. He covered numerous field sites in five districts of the state of West Bengal, but could not submit his thesis, as government did not permit even a short sabbatical. Sircar has, however, published parts of his findings through several articles. His academic work entitled The Construction of the Hindu Identity in Medieval Western Bengal: The Role of Popular Cults (2005) was very well received in India and abroad. Tapan Raychaudhuri of Oxford University had commended him for "his exceptional analytical power and depth of knowledge in diverse fields". Ralph Nicholas, emeritus professor of anthropology, Chicago University, has described him "an outstanding historical and interpretive anthropologist".

Jawhar Sircar has published numerous articles on cultural, historical and anthropological subjects for several years in books, as also in noted national and international journals and newspapers. He has also delivered several talks on the subjects of history, religion, contemporary affairs and the intersection between religion and anthropology. The Asiatic Society of Kolkata (established in 1774) has conferred its Biman Behari Memorial Award on him for his contribution to popularising the study of history and politics.

From 2017 to 2020, he has chaired the Board of Governors of the prestigious Centre for Studies in Social Sciences, Kolkata – one of India's top 5 social science research and teaching institutes. Sircar was, in fact, its first non academic chairman in its half century history.

As an officer of India's premier Indian Administrative Service, Jawhar Sircar has served in the sectors of finance, commerce and industries for 17 years and in 'public communication', i.e., in the administration of education, culture and media for more than a dozen years. He was honoured by the British Museum with its silver medal for piloting museum reforms in the country. The former President of India has publicly complimented him as an "outstanding performer and visionary", while the former Prime Minister described him as "one of India's most distinguished civil servants."

Academics and publications 

He has been active in research even while working full-time in administration. He has published numerous articles on cultural, historical and anthropological subjects for several years. He has published research papers on the subjects of history, culture, media  & society.

He has also delivered talks on the subjects of history, culture and media. His monograph: The Construction of the Hindu Identity in Medieval Western Bengal: The Role of Popular Cults was well received in India and abroad.

His writings are both available in Bangla as well as English newspapers.

Education 

Jawhar Sircar studied at St. Xavier's School, Presidency College and Calcutta University - all in Kolkata.
He did his master's degree in Ancient Indian History and Culture from Calcutta University and a second Masters in Sociology, with Social Anthropology. He graduated in Political Science from Presidency College, standing 2nd in Calcutta University. He also studied at the University of Cambridge and the University of Sussex in the UK.

Career in administration

After joining the Indian Administrative Service (IAS) in 1975 in West Bengal (India), he held several postings in the districts of Burdwan and 24 Parganas where he made a name for himself in tackling very difficult problems including communal riots. After this, he moved on to become the Secretary in the Finance Department looking after Expenditure., he was appointed Sales Tax Commissioner of West Bengal where he could secure the highest rate of growth in the 1990s.

In May, 2006, Sircar was called to the Government of India in New Delhi, on promotion as Additional Secretary and Development Commissioner for Micro, Small and Medium Enterprises (MSME), a term that he helped introduce through a new Act of Parliament. He is known as the pioneer of 'Cluster Development', as well as for grass-roots financing of tiny industries, including Micro Finance and also for initiating several reforms in the sector.

In September 2008, he was elevated as Secretary to Government of India, and moved on to head the Ministry of Culture, where he served as its longest-serving Secretary till early 2012.He initiated long-pending reforms and took up the modernization of museums, archives, and libraries. He is credited with introducing many new programmes to assist cultural organizations and their expressions. Jawhar Sircar was successful in forging a significant number of cultural partnerships between India and other countries, and among his major credits are the Anish Kapoor exhibition from the UK and the holding of seven unique overseas exhibitions of the original paintings of Rabindra Nath Tagore which had not left India shores for more than 80 years.

He also had two short stints as acting Secretary, Ministry of Information & Broadcasting, Government of India.

Sircar has worked in the fields of Finance, Commerce and Industries for 17 of his 38 years in public service, where he has managed large corporations, including the multibillion-dollar Haldia Petrochemicals.

On the other hand, he has also worked in the field of public communication: i.e., in Education, Culture and Media related assignments, for over 11 years.

Controversies 

Jawhar Sircar made an anti-Brahmin tweet claiming that ‘Brahmanic rulers’ destroyed Buddhist structures. The tweet was later deleted. He served as the CEO of Prasar Bharati from 2012 to 2016, and now Member of the Upper House (Rajya Sabha) of the Indian Parliament who was nominated by the All India Trinamool Congress party. A formal employee of Prasar Bharati and great grandson of C. Rajagopalachari pointed out that his leader Trinamool supremo Mamata Banerjee is also a Brahmin. Another sitting Rajya Sabha MP and Shiv Sena deputy leader Priyanka Chaturvedi said Jawhar Sircar's comments against Brahmins were hateful and vile, and requested an apology.

Association

Jawhar Sircar was a member of the Governing Councils of Indian Council of World Affairs, Consortium for Educational Communication, Film & Television Institute of India and also Trustee/GB Member of IIM (India Institute of Management), Kolkata, Victoria Memorial Museum, Indian Museum, National Museum, National Library, National School of Drama, IGNCA, and the Three National Akademies.

He has also served on the National Advisory Council of Spic Macay., and was nominated on the National Executive Council of CII. He had also been on the Board of Governors of Media Research Users Council (MRUC), Mumbai, which does research/surveys for readership, viewership and listenership of various media for advertising. He had been on the advisory board of CEMPD, Kolkata ( Centre for Environmental Management and Participatory Development. Sircar has also been a Trustee Member of PSBT (Public Service Broadcasting Trust) from 2012 to 2016.

Other interests

Jawhar Sircar was Vice President of the All India Tennis Association, and served as the President of India's pioneering Children's Little Theatre. 
Sircar has also been a Trustee Member of PSBT (Public Service Broadcasting Trust) from 2012 to 2016.

He is a Life Member of the 240-year-old Asiatic Society, Indian National Confederation and Academy of Anthropologists, & Cultural Heritage, Bangiya Sahitya Parishad, Indian History Congress and several other well-known institutions.

He was the moving spirit behind the Kolkata International Film Festival from 1997 to 2005, and has organized several film and media related programmes, with participation of many countries.

Sircar was instrumental in the management of world's largest Book Fair, in terms of attendance, i.e., the Kolkata Book Fair in its early years.

Awards 

  Best CEO Award in 2013(Two years after joining PB)
  Maulana Jameel Ilyasi Excellency Award – August, 2013
  News Television Network CEO of the Year ENBA 2013 Award
  Corporate Broadcaster of the Year, Award by Calcutta Management Association 
 In 2015 Digital Studio Broadcasting & Production Magazine had placed him among the 10 most important people in the broadcasting industry.

References

External links

 

1952 births
Living people
Alumni of Queens' College, Cambridge
Rajya Sabha members from West Bengal